Street food of Kolkata is the food sold by hawkers and street vendors from portable market stalls in the streets of Kolkata, India. It is one of the major characteristics of the city, which makes Kolkata the "City of Joy". Kolkata's street foods include Indian street food as well as Chinese, Mughlai, British, and even European foods.

Varieties
Luchi Alur dom
Luchi and Alur dom is most popular, cheap and consumed street food in Kolkata. Daily workers or passer-by people prefer luchi and alur dom for it's good taste and fast consumption. Instead of luchi in many shops puri, Kochuri, Parota, Naan are served with Alur dom, Paneer Curry etc. 

Pakora
 Street vendors and restaurants sell various types of Pakoras like potato, egg, onion, cauliflower and chicken. Chicken pakora is most famous pakora among the consumers.

Fast food stalls
Stalls containing fast foods are frequently seen in the streets which contains Indian as well as Chinese fast foods. Notable fast foods include chowmin, fish finger, Momo, Chicken Pokora/Cutlett, Egg roll, Chicken roll etc.

South Indian foods
South Indian foods like Idli, sambhar, Dhosa, Masala Dhosa, Coconut chutney are one of most consumed street foods in Kolkata since these are easy to ready and easy to eat.
 Kulfi 
Kulfi is very famous street food in Kolkata, known for it's cooling and satisfying effect in summer times, available in flavours like malai, kesar and elaichi.

Other street foods
Other street food of Kolkata includes Momo, Papri chat, Phuchka, Ghugni and Singara chat, Telebhaja, Radha Ballavi and Masala Kochuri, Aloo Kabli, Jilipi, Ghoti Gorom, Badam Makha, Doodh cola etc.

Areas and spread
Although Kolkata has street food stalls in nearly every part of the city, it specifically has many areas famous for it's different types of street foods. North Kolkata has comparatively more street food stalls than South Kolkata. Surya Sen Street, Sealdah, Bidhan Sarani, Shyambazar has some notable stalls famous since 90s.

Decars Lane or James Hicky Sarani is a lane in Dharmatala, Central Kolkata, which is famous for it's cheap and tasty food stalls. Maniktala has famous shop which still sells per kochuri at 25 and 50 Paisa.

Exide more near Rabindra Sadan, Shyambazar 5-point crossing etc. are famous for it's momo.

See also
Indian fast food
Street food of Mumbai
Street food of Chennai

References

Street food in India